Ahmaad Rorie (born January 1, 1996) is an American basketball player for Mega Basket of the Basketball League of Serbia and the ABA League.

Born and raised in Tacoma, Washington, Rorie played high school basketball at both Clover Park and Lincoln High School. After one year with Oregon and three years at Montana Rorie entered the 2019 NBA draft but was not selected in the draft's two rounds.

High school career
Rorie began his high school tenure with at Clover Park High School, in Lakewood, Washington. After his freshman year, he moved to Lincoln High School in Tacoma, Washington. According to ESPN he was rated as the No. 3 prep prospect in the state of Washington.

College career
Rorie started his college career with Oregon. After one season with the Ducks, Rorie was transferred to Montana, in order to find more playing time. During his tenure with the Grizzlies, Rorie was named two times to the First-team All-Big Sky and one time to the Second-team All-Big Sky. As a senior, he was the Big Sky tournament MVP. He averaged 14.9 points, four rebounds and four assists per game. Rorie finished his Montana career ranked sixth in program history with 1,654 points.

Professional career
After going undrafted in the 2019 NBA draft, Rorie joined Keravnos of the Cypriot League. Due to the spread of COVID-19, the season in Cyprus was ended without a champion. During his first year with Keravnos, he averaged 13.6 points, 5 rebounds and 3.8 assists per game. On May 7, 2020 it was announced that Rorie has signed to return to play for Keravnos for another season.

On July 23, 2021, he has signed with Élan Chalon of the Pro B. Rorie averaged 7.4 points, 3.3 rebounds, and 3.0 assists per game. On December 15, 2021, he signed with Egis Körmend of the Nemzeti Bajnokság I/A. Rorie signed with BC Balkan Botevgrad of the Bulgarian National Basketball League on January 26, 2022.

In July 2022, Rorie signed a contract with Mega Basket.

References

External links
Montana Grizzlies bio
Keravnos B.C. profile

1995 births
Living people
ABA League players
African-American basketball players
American expatriate basketball people in Cyprus
American expatriate basketball people in France
American expatriate basketball people in Serbia
American men's basketball players
Basketball players from Tacoma, Washington
Keravnos B.C. players
KK Mega Basket players
Montana Grizzlies basketball players
Oregon Ducks men's basketball players
21st-century African-American sportspeople